Sandown Pier is a pleasure pier in Sandown, Isle of Wight, England.

History

Plans for the pier were drawn up in the 1860s and bill passed in Parliament in 1864. However, construction did not start until 1876. The first section of the pier measured  and it was opened on 29 May 1878 by Lady Oglander widow of Sir Henry Oglander, 7th Baronet.

Work to extend the pier to its full intended length were started in 1894. The new works were badly damaged in a storm on 12 January 1895.

A landing stage was provided to allow passengers to arrive and depart by steamer. A pavilion to accommodate 400 people was constructed on the head of the pier with an elliptical dome. These works of improvement cost around £10,800.

The pier was taken over the Sandown Urban District Council in 1918.

In 1934 the pavilion at the shore end of the pier was opened by John Jellicoe, 1st Earl Jellicoe. It had cost £26,000.

In August 1989 a fire broke out in the amusement arcade and spread into the theatre causing damage estimated at £2,000,000. However, restoration was undertaken and the pier was reopened for the 1990 summer season.

Facilities
The pier has a range of indoor amenities at the landward end, and an outdoor funfair and landing stage at the seaward end. There are cafes, a children's play area, an amusement arcade, bowling and an indoor crazy golf course.

References

External links
Sandown pier website
National Piers Society: Sandown Culver Pier
English Seaside Piers - Culver Pier, Sandown, Isle of Wight

Piers on the Isle of Wight
Buildings and structures on the Isle of Wight
Tourist attractions on the Isle of Wight
Pier